Anthony Bottom aka Jalil Abdul Muntaqim (born Anthony Jalil Bottom; October 18, 1951) political activist and former member of the Black Panther Party (BPP) and the Black Liberation Army (BLA) who served 49 years in prison for two counts of first-degree murder. In August 1971, he was arrested in California along with Albert “Nuh” Washington and Herman Bell. He was charged with the killing of two NYPD police officers, Waverly Jones and Joseph A. Piagentini, in New York City on May 21. In 1974, he was convicted on two counts of first-degree murder and sentenced to life imprisonment with possible parole after 22 years. Bottom had been the subject of attention for being repeatedly denied parole despite having been eligible since 1993. In June 2020, Bottom was reportedly sick with coronavirus disease. He was released from prison on October 7, 2020, after more than 49 years of incarceration and 11 parole denials.

Early life and political development
Anthony Bottom aka Jalil Muntaqim was born Anthony Jalil Bottom in Oakland, California and grew up in San Francisco. Drawn to the civil rights activism during the 1960s, Bottom joined and began organizing for the National Association for the Advancement of Colored People (NAACP) during his teenage years. In high school he played an active role in the Black Student Union and was often recruited to play the voice of and engage in “speak outs” on behalf of the organization. He was also involved in street protests against police brutality.

At the age of 18, Bottom joined the Black Panther Party after the assassination of Martin Luther King, Jr. King's assassination solidified Bottom's beliefs that armed resistance was necessary to combat racism and the oppression of Black individuals in society. While a member of the Black Panther Party, Bottom held beliefs which paralleled those of the underground organization, the Black Liberation Army, which focused on radical means of obtaining equality. Its members served as experts in military strategy and were “the essential armed wing of the above-ground political apparatus.”

Arrest and imprisonment
On August 28, 1971, Bottom and Albert “Nuh” Washington were arrested for the attempted murder of a San Francisco police sergeant. New York City police charged Bottom, Washington, and another BPP and BLA member, Herman Bell, with the May 21, 1971, killings of two New York City police officers, P.O. Joseph Piagentini and P.O. Waverly Jones. The ambush of the officers came after George Jackson was killed by guards during an escape attempt in San Quentin Prison in 1971, which was the possible substantiation for a motive for retaliation. While Washington died of liver cancer in April 2000, in New York State’s Coxsackie Correctional Facility, Bell and Bottom were paroled in 2018 and 2020, respectively.

Bottom remained politically active throughout his incarceration, writing theoretical texts as well as organizing with activists both inside and outside prison. In 1976, he founded the National Prisoners Campaign to petition the United Nations to recognize the existence of political prisoners in the United States. He was also involved in the National Prisoners Afrikan Studies Project, an organization that educates inmates on their rights.

Bottom, while incarcerated, converted to Islam and chose to be addressed by the Muslim name Jalil Abdul Muntaqim.  The English translation of Muntaqim is "avenger." Despite his claims to the contrary, Bottom was never a political prisoner because he was convicted for murder and not his political beliefs. He never made a legal name change and is still known by the state of New York as Anthony Bottom. He was portrayed by actor Richard Brooks in the 1985 tv movie Badge of the Assassin.

In July 2009, Bottom pleaded no contest to conspiracy to commit voluntary manslaughter in connection with the 1971 killing of police officer John Victor Young. Bell, also a defendant, pleaded guilty to voluntary manslaughter and received probation. Charges were eventually dismissed against another defendant, Francisco Torres, in 2011.

Parole and release
While abolitionists and organizations within the progressive movement believed he should be paroled, supporters of the police and a large portion of the general public forcefully opposed his release. Former New York City mayor Michael R. Bloomberg in 2002 publicized his opposition to parole Bottom. He states: “Anthony Bottom's crime is unforgivable, and its consequences will remain forever with the families of the police officers, as well as the men and women of the New York City Police Department.” Councilman Charles Barron, a self-described black revolutionary, is one of Bottom's active advocates.

Anthony Bottom had a hearing with the parole board on November 17, 2009 and was again denied parole. He remained incarcerated at Attica. He was transferred from Attica Correctional Facility to Southport Correctional Facility near Elmira, New York, in early January, 2017.

In June 2020, Bottom was reported to be under treatment in a prison hospital for Coronavirus disease. He attempted to gain release based on public health guidance advising the release of medically vulnerable people, but New York state attorney general Letitia James challenged the appeal, and the courts struck down a judge’s order mandating his release. Within a few months, however, the parole board approved him for release, and supporters confirmed that he had finally left prison on October 7.

The day after his release, Bottom filled out a voting registration form despite not being eligible to vote. He was charged with two felony counts and the lesser offence of providing a false affidavit, but the grand jury in the case refused to indict him.

References

External links

Bibliography

Books authored
 We Are Our Own Liberators: Selected Prison Writings. Arissa Media Group, 2nd expanded edition 2010. 
 Escaping the Prism.. Fade to Black: Poetry and Essays. Kersplebedeb, 2015. 

1951 births
Activists from California
American people convicted of murdering police officers
Living people
Members of the Black Liberation Army
Members of the Black Panther Party
People convicted of murder by New York (state)
People from Oakland, California